Michael Anthony Roseberry (born 28 November 1966 in Houghton-le-Spring, County Durham) is a former English cricketer.

Mike Roseberry was educated at Durham School, where he formed a reputation as an all-round sportsman. As an exciting right-handed batsman, he was honoured by The Cricket Society.

He represented Middlesex in two spells (1984–1994; Cap 1990 and 1999–2001), Durham (1995–1998; Captain 1995-1996). He forged a successful opening partnership for Middlesex with Desmond Haynes and he enjoyed his best season in 1992 with 2,044 runs in first-class cricket. This led him to being picked for the England "A" tour of Australia. However, his career did not kick on from this height.
He left Middlesex to take on the captaincy of his home county of Durham, but suffered a miserable loss of form. He was soon relieved of the captaincy and
in four seasons there never made a County Championship century. He returned to Middlesex in 1999 with limited success, never reproducing the form of his best years.
He was awarded a testimonial by Middlesex in 2002.

He is the elder son of Matty Roseberry, a successful Durham businessman and his younger brother Andrew represented Leicestershire and Glamorgan. He is a supporter of Sunderland Football Club, and is married to Helen with two daughters. His

External links
 Cricinfo
 Cricket Archive

1966 births
Living people
Durham cricket captains
Durham cricketers
English cricket captains
English cricketers
Middlesex cricketers
People educated at Durham School
People from Houghton-le-Spring
Cricketers from Tyne and Wear